A list of films produced in South Korea in 1969:

References

External links
1969 in South Korea

 1960-1969 at koreanfilm.org

South Korea
1969
Films